Syria (SYR) competed at the 1971 Mediterranean Games in Izmir, Turkey. The medal tally was 8.

See also
 Syria at the 1975 Mediterranean Games

Nations at the 1971 Mediterranean Games
1971
Mediterranean Games